Masillamys is an extinct genus of rodent. It was named in 1954 by Tobien based on fossils found in the Quercy Phosphorites Formation, France. It is considered to be a sister genus to the Hartenbergeromys, Lophiparamys, Mattimys, Microparamys, Pantrogna, Sparnacomys, and Strathcona genera.

References

Further reading 
 ESCARGUEL G. 1999. Les rongeurs de l'Eocène inférieur et moyen d'Europe Occidentale. Systématique, phylogénie, biochronologie et paléobiogéographie des niveaux-repères MP 7 a MP 14 = The rodents of the early and middle Eocene from Western Europe. Palaeovertebrata 28 (2-4): 89-351. abstract

Eocene rodents
Prehistoric rodent genera
Priabonian life
Eocene mammals of Europe
Paleogene France
Fossils of France
Quercy Phosphorites Formation
Fossil taxa described in 1954